George R. Allen was a member of the Wisconsin State Assembly.

Biography
Allen was born on August 9, 1838 in Hartford, New York. He died on December 20, 1901 in Lake Geneva, Wisconsin and was buried there.

Assembly career
Allen was a member of the Assembly in 1880. He was a Republican.

References

External links

Political Graveyard

People from Washington County, New York
Republican Party members of the Wisconsin State Assembly
1838 births
1901 deaths
Burials in Wisconsin
19th-century American politicians